William J. Smith may refer to:

 Bill Smith (baseball manager), 19th century baseball manager
 William Jay Smith (Tennessee politician) (1823–1913)
 William Jay Smith (1918–2015), American poet

See also
William Smith (disambiguation)